This is a list of North Dakota Fighting Hawks football players in the NFL Draft.

Key

Selections

References

North Dakota

North Dakota Fighting Hawks NFL Draft
und is good